MH4 may refer to:

 Monster Hunter 4, video game
 Saurer MH4, military vehicle
 MH4, a type of metal hydride
 MH4, a sub-classification of the H4 classification in Paralympic cycling